Glamorama Spies for flute, clarinet, violin, violoncello and piano is a chamber-music work by Italian composer Lorenzo Ferrero, written in 1999.

Overview
The composition was commissioned by Sentieri Selvaggi and first performed by them at the Teatro Manzoni in the year 2000. The American premiere took place in Houston on 17 February 2014.

Glamorama Spies was inspired by Bret Easton Ellis' 1998 satire novel Glamorama.

Analysis
The piece consists of a single movement lasting around six minutes, written in a chromatic and dissonant idiom. 
The opening section begins with a semitonal "anxiety" theme and ostinato figures atop an ostinato bass line, marked by off-beat bass accents. A lyrical section follows in which these elements gradually move to the background while a gentle, contrapuntal "sentimental" theme emerges in the cello. The exchange between the two contrasting main themes is interrupted from time to time by dramatic chords on the piano, representing the point of view of the protagonist. The final section recapitulates some of the thematic material of the first section. At the end, the tension subsides, leaving room for ethereal harmonies and a conclusive ending.

Discography
In chronological order of recording:

 2002. Bad Blood. Sentieri Selvaggi. CD recording. Sensible Records.
 2006. AC/DC. Sentieri Selvaggi. CD recording. Cantaloupe Music.

Notes

References
 Borsari, Bruno, ed. (2006). 20 anni di musica insieme. Bologna: Pendragon.  
 Mandel, Naomi, ed. (2010). Bret Easton Ellis: American Psycho, Glamorama, Lunar Park. New York: Continuum.

External links
 Casa Ricordi Catalogue
 Casa Ricordi Digital Collection
 Glamorama Spies video clip
 WNYC-FM radio broadcast, 2009
 WQXR radio broadcast, 2016

Compositions by Lorenzo Ferrero
2000 compositions
20th-century classical music
Chamber music compositions
Contemporary classical compositions
Music commissioned by ensembles or performers